The North Broadway Street Historic District is a  historic district in De Pere, Wisconsin which was listed on the National Register of Historic Places in 1983. It included 47 contributing buildings and seven non-contributing ones.

The district is located on the north side of De Pere. Contributing buildings within its boundaries were constructed from 1836 to 1923 and were built in a variety of architectural styles.

Buildings deemed to have "pivotal" historic importance within the district (with building # as in NRHP document, and photo # as in linked photos) are:
Kellogg-McGeehan Residence, 515 N. Broadway St., a two-story frame house with, on its front facade, a projecting pavilion and a full-length one-story veranda
J.S. Chase Residence, 602 N. Broadway St., a two-and-a-half-story Queen Anne house with a square tower.  Its "architectural character" has been "compromised by siding"
H.J. Wheeler Residence, 620 N. Broadway St., a brick house with a shingled mansard roof and a recessed corner tower (building #33, photo #34)
F.A. Dunham Residence, 639 N. Broadway St., a two-story-plus-attic house with a tower. Its interior was remodeled in 1925 to Stick/Shingle fashion.
Randall Wilcox Residence, 707 N. Broadway St., with two-story central flanked by one-story wings.  It has Greek Revival-style entablatures.
E.E. Bolles Residence, 721 N. Broadway St., built as a large Queen Anne house, but its picturesque massing was reduced by early 20th-century renovations.  It has a historic one-story carriage house at the rear.
A.G. Wells Residence, 807 N. Broadway St., a large two-and-a-half-story "English eclectic manor of stone, with stucco and wood trim"
John P. Dousman Residence, 813 N. Broadway St., a late Queen Anne cottage
John S. Gittens Residence, 823 N. Broadway St., built as a two-and-a-half-story gambrel roof Colonial Revival, it received a gable-front compatible addition
E.P. Smith Residence, 903 N. Broadway St., a red brick house with original interior woodwork and Adamsesque fireplace (building #23, photo #21)
Capt. Joseph G. Lawton Residence, 935 N. Broadway St., a stone Italianate house whose appearance was accomplished in 1914 and 1920 remodelings.  An earlier 1858 stone house, of Captain Joseph Lawton, appears not to have survived within.
Gustave H. Fleck Residence, 432 N. Wisconsin St., with elements of Queen Anne and Colonial Revival style
F.E. White Residence, 421 Cass St., a two-story frame Greek Revival house with a veranda having square columns topped by square Doric capitals.
Jacob Falk Residence, 321 N. Wisconsin St., a Queen Anne cottage with a corner tower and a veranda.

See also
Otto and Hilda Gretzinger House, at 922 N. Broadway, across from several houses in this district, was separately listed on the National Register in 2011.

Notes

References

Historic districts on the National Register of Historic Places in Wisconsin
National Register of Historic Places in Brown County, Wisconsin
Queen Anne architecture in Wisconsin